A statue of Charles III of Spain (also known as King Carlos III) is installed in Los Angeles' El Pueblo de Los Ángeles Historical Monument, in the U.S. state of California. Previously, the statue was installed in MacArthur Park, in the city's Westlake neighborhood.

References

External links 

 Carlos III at the Historical Marker Database

El Pueblo de Los Ángeles Historical Monument
Monuments and memorials in Los Angeles
Outdoor sculptures in Greater Los Angeles
Sculptures of men in California
Statues in Los Angeles
Relocated buildings and structures in California
Westlake, Los Angeles